Montclair is a township in Essex County in the U.S. state of New Jersey. Situated on the cliffs of the Watchung Mountains, Montclair is a wealthy and diverse suburban commuter town of New York City within the New York metropolitan area. As of the 2020 United States census, the township's population was 40,921, an increase of 3,252 (+8.6%) from the 2010 census count of 37,669, which in turn reflected a decline of 1,308 (−3.4%) from the 38,977 counted in the 2000 census. As of 2010, it was the 60th-most-populous municipality in New Jersey.

Montclair was initially formed as a township on April 15, 1868, from portions of Bloomfield Township, so that a second railroad could be built to Montclair. After a referendum held on February 21, 1894, Montclair was reincorporated as a town, effective February 24, 1894. It derives its name from the French mont clair, meaning "clear mountain" or "bright mountain."

In 1980, after multiple protests filed by Montclair officials regarding inequities built into the federal revenue-sharing system, Montclair passed a referendum changing its name to the "Township of Montclair," becoming the third of more than a dozen Essex County municipalities to reclassify themselves as townships to take advantage of federal revenue sharing policies that allocated townships a greater share of government aid to municipalities on a per capita basis.

Montclair, which opened the state's first marijuana dispensary in December 2012, joins Bellmawr, Cranbury, Egg Harbor Township and Woodbridge Township as one of the five municipalities (of 565 in the state) in New Jersey that have authorized the sale of medical cannabis.

Geography

According to the U.S. Census Bureau, the township had a total area of 6.25 square miles (16.17 km2), including 6.24 square miles (16.16 km2) of land and 0.01 square miles (0.02 km2) of water (0.11%).

Montclair is on the east side of the First Mountain of the Watchung Mountains.

Named localities in the township include Church Street, Frog Hollow, South End, Upper Montclair and Watchung Plaza.

Montclair is split between two ZIP Codes.  The central and southern parts of the township are designated 07042. Upper Montclair lies north of Watchung Avenue and has a separate ZIP code, 07043. Because the ZIP codes do not exactly match municipal boundaries, a few homes near the borders with neighboring towns fall into the ZIP codes for those communities. A few homes in some adjoining municipalities use one of the two ZIP codes assigned to Montclair, as does HackensackUMC Mountainside (07042, formerly known as Mountainside Hospital), whose campus straddles the border with Glen Ridge. Small areas in the southeast of the township fall into the Glen Ridge ZIP code 07028.

Several streams flow eastward through Montclair: Toney's Brook in the center, Nishuane Brook in the southeast, the Wigwam Brook in the southwest, Pearl Brook in the northwest, and Yantacaw Brook in the northeast—all in the Passaic River watershed.  Yantacaw and Toney's brooks are dammed in parks to create ponds. Wigwam, Nishuane, and Toney's brooks flow into the Second River, and the others flow into the Third River.  Montclair lies just north of the northernmost extent of the Rahway River watershed.

Montclair borders the municipalities of Bloomfield, Cedar Grove, Glen Ridge, Orange, Verona and West Orange in Essex County; and Clifton and Little Falls in Passaic County.

The southern border of Montclair is a straight line between Eagle Rock, on the ridge of the First Watchung Mountain, and the point where Orange Road begins at the foot of Ridgewood Avenue.  The eastern border is roughly a straight line between that point and a point just southwest of where Broad Street crosses the Third River. The western border runs roughly along the ridge of the First Watchung Mountain between Eagle Rock and the Essex County/Passaic County border.  The northern border is the border between those two counties.

Climate
Montclair has a temperate climate, with warm-to-hot, humid summers and cool to cold winters, as is characteristic of the Köppen climate classification humid continental climate. January tends to be the coldest month, with average high temperatures in the upper 30s Fahrenheit and lows averaging 21. July, the warmest month, features high temperatures in the mid-80s and lows in the 70s, with an average high of 86 degrees. From April to June and from September to early November, Montclair experiences temperatures from the lower 60s to the lower 70s.

Snowfall is common from December to early March, and totals about  annually. The number of days each year in Montclair with any measurable precipitation is 90; the area has an average of 202 sunny days.

Montclair is one or two degrees warmer than the neighboring municipalities of Verona and Cedar Grove because of the mountain between them, which sometimes blocks winds and clouds, including warmer air from the ocean to the east.

Demographics

The township has long celebrated its diversity, a feature that has attracted many to the community. The African American population has been stable at around 30% for decades, although it fell from 32% in the 2000 Census to 27% in 2010.

Montclair has attracted many New Yorkers. Many residents work for major media organizations in New York City, including The New York Times and Newsweek. A March 11, 2007, posting in the blog Gawker.com listed some of those who work in the media and live in Montclair. Many residents are commuters to New York City and the Metro Area.

2010 census

The Census Bureau's 2006–2010 American Community Survey showed that (in 2010 inflation-adjusted dollars) median household income was $95,696 (with a margin of error of +/− $5,396) and the median family income was $126,983 (+/− $8,950). Males had a median income of $83,589 (+/− $5,955) versus $66,063 (+/− $3,616) for females. The per capita income for the township was $53,572 (+/− $2,671). About 4.6% of families and 2.7% of the population were below the poverty line, including 7.0% of those under age 18 and 4.6% of those age 65 or over.

2000 census
As of the 2000 United States census, 38,977 people, 15,020 households, and 9,687 families resided in the township. The population density was 6,184 people per square mile (2,389/km2). There were 15,531 housing units at an average density of 2,464 per square mile (951.8/km2). The racial makeup of the CDP was 59.77% White, 32.06% African American, 3.15% Asian, 0.19% Native American, 0.04% Pacific Islander, 1.77% from other races, and 3.03% from two or more races. Hispanic or Latino of any race were 5.12% of the population.

Of the 15,020 households in Montclair, 34.3% included children under the age of 18, 47.2% were married couples living together, 14.1% had a female householder with no husband present, and 35.5% were non-families. Individuals living alone accounted for 29.3% of all households, and in 8.6% of households, that individual was 65 years of age or older. The average household size was 2.53 and the average family size was 3.16.

Like most stable, mature communities, Montclair had many people in each age group, with 25.6% under the age of 18, 6.6% from 18 to 24, 31.9% from 25 to 44, 24.1% from 45 to 64, and 12.0% who were 65 years of age or older. The median age was 38 years. For every 100 females, there were 86.3 males. For every 100 females age 18 and over, there were 80.7 males.

The median income for a household in the township was $74,894, and the median income for a family was $96,252. Males had a median income of $64,151 versus $43,520 for females. The per capita income for the township was $44,870. About 3.9% of families and 5.6% of the population were below the poverty line, including 5.4% of those under age 18 and 7.2% of those age 65 or over.

Economy
Montclair has six distinct commercial zones:
 Montclair Center, centered on the intersection of Bloomfield Avenue, South Fullerton Avenue, Glenridge Avenue and Church Street, is the township's main commercial zone. This intersection is also known as Six Corners.  It is home to some of Montclair's largest stores and restaurants and features many upscale restaurants and boutiques near the center of this commercial district. Near the eastern end of this district is Lackawanna Plaza, which once housed the Lackawanna railway station.  There is a post office one block to the north of this area. In 2015, Montclair Center won the Great American Main Street Award from the National Trust for Historic Preservation.
 Upper Montclair, in the north of the town, is the second-largest commercial zone. The center is the intersection of Valley Road and Bellevue Avenue, and incorporates the surrounding areas.  The Upper Montclair Business District is home to several restaurants and shops. This commercial zone is home to several chain stores such as Starbucks, Talbots, Williams Sonoma, Athleta, Cold Stone Creamery, Supercuts and CVS. Despite the recession, the area in 2009–2010 saw the opening of several new national and local merchants. Upper Montclair also has both a park, Anderson Park, and a railway station, Upper Montclair, nearby.  There is a post office here.
 Watchung Plaza is located around the intersection of Watchung Avenue and Park Street and is on the divide between two Montclair ZIP Codes, 07042 and 07043. It is home to many "Mom and Pop Stores" and other small businesses. Watchung Plaza has its own post office.  It is served by the Watchung Avenue station.
 Walnut Street, built around the Walnut Street train station. In the spring, summer, and fall it is home to the Montclair Farmer's Market. This commercial zone is home to many restaurants and cafes as well home to Montclair Brewery, New Jersey's first black-owned microbrewery and Montclair's only operating brewery. 
 South End, in the south of town, at the intersection of Cedar Avenue and Orange Road.
 Valley Road, between Chestnut Street and Claremont Avenue, is known locally as "Frog Hollow." This area has some strip-mall style shops on one side of Valley Road, and on the other side window shops with residential apartments on top of them.

Arts and culture

Whole Theatre

In 1971, the actors Louis Zorich and his wife, the later Oscar winning actress, Olympia Dukakis, founded a theatre group which included Remi Barclay, Jason Bosseau, Margery Fierst, Gerald Fierst and many others. Some of the acting artistic and administrative participants were permanent, semi-permanent. Performances were peppered by visits and occasional celebrity artists. Naming themselves Whole Theatre, they based themselves in Montclair. Located  from Midtown Manhattan via the Lincoln Tunnel under the Hudson River, the Whole Theatre productions were readily available to New York City and New Jersey audiences.

In the two decades in which Whole Theatre flourished, they presented a long list of performances in a wide variety of genres. Productions included the Rose Tattoo, Mother Courage, Rabelais: a Dramatic Game (1985), and America at Full Moon (1986).

They enjoyed the support of the local community and the theatre community of New York and New Jersey generally. For example, in 1975–1976 the company acknowledged over 120 substantial donors in their program as well as funding from the New Jersey State Council on the Arts and the Rockefeller Brothers Fund.

In 1989, Olympia Dukakis was named as the company’s Artistic Director. Her two co-directors were Remi Barclay and Gerald Fierst, who were jointly responsible for Education and Outreach.
In 2018 Brooke Lea Foster of The New York Times stated that it was one of several "least suburban of suburbs, each one celebrated by buyers there for its culture and hip factor, as much as the housing stock and sophisticated post-city life."

Art institutions
Montclair hosts many art institutions and theaters, and despite its relatively small size, has many art venues. It has its own art museum, the Montclair Art Museum, and several small galleries.

Montclair also hosts one cinema, the Claridge Cinema on Bloomfield Avenue which shows different types of movies from documentaries to small scale indie films. The township hosted its first annual film festival in 2012 to provide a platform for filmmakers from New Jersey, the US and the world.

Live theaters include The Montclair Operetta Company, the Wellmont Theater, Montclair State University's Kasser Theater, Montclair State University's theater in Life Hall, and the Studio Playhouse. On Bloomfield Avenue there is a public stage used for concerts and other events. Dotted around Montclair there are also many art galleries, though most are centered in the Bloomfield Avenue Downtown Area. Concerts are held at the [Wellmont Theater and at several churches and auditoriums sponsored by Outpost in the Burbs, a community-based organization. In 2017, The Montclair Orchestra was formed as a semi-professional orchestra, composed of both professionals and students from top colleges.

Montclair was the setting for some of the stories in the HBO television series The Sopranos, and many Montclair streets, locations and businesses were featured in the show, such as Bloomfield Avenue.

Montclair Public Library is one of the oldest public libraries in New Jersey, with the largest collection of materials in northern New Jersey. Following the COVID-19 pandemic, Montclair City Council became increasing aggressive towards library funding, cutting funding to the minimum levels required by New Jersey law. Following a forensic audit, in which no irregularities were found, its Director, Peter Coyl, announced his departure.

Music history

Herman Hupfeld, composer of the song "As Time Goes By", was born in Montclair, attended Montclair High School, and lived his life here. The song was voted No. 2 on the AFI's 100 Years...100 Songs special, commemorating the best songs in film, (only surpassed by "Over the Rainbow"). In 1935, Hupfeld built his home at 259 Park Street in Upper Montclair with the royalties from his songs. After "As time goes By" was featured in the 1942 film "Casablanca" his financial position improved even more. He is buried in the Montclair Cemetery. The house is now owned by former Whole Theatre Director and civil celebrant Gerald Fierst. The top floor of the house has a grand living room space where soirees were held in the late 1930s attended by such luminaries as Bing Crosby and Mae West.

Sports
 Independent baseball league New Jersey Jackals of the Frontier League. The Jackals played at Yogi Berra Stadium, which has seating for 3,784, plus overflow capacity from 1998 until 2022. The Jackals moved to Hinchliffe Stadium in Paterson, New Jersey.
 New York Red Bulls II, the USL Championship affiliate of Major League Soccer's New York Red Bulls, play at Montclair State University as of 2017.
 Floyd Hall Arena, an ice rink which is actually located in Little Falls on the grounds of Montclair State University and is host to its ice hockey club.  The facility also hosts other hockey leagues and teams and other on-ice sports.
 Home to the New Jersey Pride of Major League Lacrosse for the 2004 and 2005 seasons.
 Montclair Rugby Football Club, also known as the Norsemen, of USA Rugby Division 2. They play at Codey Field.
 Essex Eagles cricket team, a division III team in the Cricket League of New Jersey.
 Montclair United Soccer Club
 Amateur Baseball Association baseball team the Montclair Giants
 Montclair Athletic Club ice hockey team, member of the American Amateur Hockey League in 1897–1898 and 1898–1899.

Parks and recreation

Montclair is home to many parks and nature reserves. Parks in Montclair are both county and municipal. Additional open space includes the Presby Memorial Iris Gardens, and many school-owned sports fields, viz., Montclair State University's Sprague Field.

Yantacaw Brook Park, covering , surrounds a pond that is fed by Yantacaw Brook and that in turn feeds into the Third River on its way towards the Passaic River.

The township has 18 public tennis courts, four skating rinks (two of which are indoor), and three public swimming pools: the Mountainside pool, the Nishuane pool, and the Essex pool.

In 2007, township residents advocated for construction of a public skatepark.  Community members revitalized the effort in 2010 and lobbied the Parks and Recreation Committee for support. The township council passed a resolution expressing approval of the project but allocated no funds for it. In the spring of 2020, an impromptu skatepark was created by community members on two of the unused tennis courts at Rand Park on North Fullerton Avenue during the COVID-19 pandemic. In July 2020, the township held a ribbon-cutting ceremony to officially recognize this space as a temporary skatepark. The township's playground insurance covers skateboarding, allowing it to allocate funds to the park. The township has paid for signage using its playground fund. All skating equipment (ramps, rails, etc.) at Rand Park has been provided by community members with no financial support from the township. At the beginning of the season, much of this equipment consisted of local materials such as picnic tables and garbage cans. By July 2020, all skating equipment present at Rand Park consisted of objects built specifically for skateboarding. On July 13, 2021, a resolution was unanimously passed by the Township Council to make the space at Rand Park a permanent skatepark. This resolution does not allocate any funds for the skatepark. Montclair Councilor-at-Large Peter Yacobellis thinks a skatepark will increase property values and improve quality of life for Montclair residents and believes the township can afford it. Commenting on how much it would cost the township, Yacobellis said "it's not much to have a kickass skate park in Montclair, in the region." Some locals see the park as a negative community influence, one of whom complained that local tennis enthusiasts were not consulted in the decision to convert the courts to a skatepark. Complaints of that nature have been dismissed by the township thus far, most likely due to the fact that Montclair has 16 other tennis courts, but no other skateparks.

Government

Local government
Since July 1, 1988, Montclair has been governed under the Council-Manager plan 13 form of municipal government under the Faulkner Act, whose originator, Bayard H. Faulkner, was a former mayor of Montclair. The township is one of 42 municipalities (of the 564) statewide that use this form of government. The governing body is comprised of the Mayor and the Township Council, who are elected to concurrent four-year terms on a non-partisan basis in elections held as part of the May municipal elections. The mayor is elected directly by the voters. The Township Council is comprised of six members, of which two council seats are elected from the township at-large and one council seat is elected from each of four wards. A deputy mayor is selected by the six council members from their members, and this position is largely ceremonial. Though the Mayor has no executive powers, the mayor presides over council meetings and has both a voice and vote in its proceedings. The Mayor appoints members to many local governing groups, most notably the board of education.

, the Mayor of Montclair is Sean M. Spiller. Members of the Montclair Township Council are Deputy Mayor William L. Hurlock (First Ward), Lori Price Abrams (Third Ward), David Cummings (Fourth Ward), Robert J. Russo (At-Large), Robin Schlager (Second Ward) and Peter Yacobellis (At-Large), all of whom serve terms of office scheduled to end on June 30, 2024.

In elections held on May 12, 2020, Sean M. Spiller was elected as mayor, defeating Renée Baskerville. Peter Yacobellis and incumbent Robert Russo won the two at-large seats, defeating the three other candidates—James Cotter, Carmel Loughman, and Roger Terry. Incumbent Robin Schlager won the Second Ward, defeating Christina M. Thomas; Lori Price Abrams defeated Marguerite Joralemon in the Third Ward; incumbent Bill Hurlock won the First Ward seat, defeating John Hearn; and David Cummings, who ran unopposed, won in the Fourth Ward.

Federal, state and county representation

Montclair is split between the 10th and 11th Congressional Districts and is part of New Jersey's 34th state legislative district. The split that took effect in 2013 drew the southern section of the township (26,730 residents) into the 10th District, while the northern portion (11,299 residents) moved to the 11th District.

Politics
As of March 2011, there were a total of 27,289 registered voters in Montclair, of which 14,782 (54.2%) were registered as Democrats, 2,581 (9.5%) were registered as Republicans and 9,903 (36.3%) were registered as unaffiliated. There were 23 voters registered as Libertarians or Greens.

In the 2016 presidential election, Democrat Hillary Clinton received 85.8% of the vote (18,048 votes), ahead of Republican Donald Trump with 11.0% (2,318 votes), and other candidates with 3.1% (661 votes), among the 21,382 ballots cast by the township's 31,610 registered voters (355 ballots were spoiled), for a turnout of 67.6%. In the 2012 presidential election, Barack Obama received 83.0% of the vote (15,811 cast), ahead of Republican Mitt Romney with 15.9% (3,034 votes), and other candidates with 1.1% (201 votes), among the 19,576 ballots cast by the township's 29,463 registered voters (530 ballots were spoiled), for a turnout of 66.4%. In the 2008 presidential election, Democrat Barack Obama received 83.0% of the vote (17,396 cast), ahead of Republican John McCain with 15.7% (3,294 votes) and other candidates with 0.6% (132 votes), among the 20,951 ballots cast by the township's 27,476 registered voters, for a turnout of 76.3%. In the 2004 presidential election, Democrat John Kerry received 78.8% of the vote (15,597 ballots cast), outpolling Republican George W. Bush with 20.2% (3,995 votes) and other candidates with 0.6% (157 votes), among the 19,804 ballots cast by the township's 25,762 registered voters, for a turnout percentage of 76.9.

In the 2013 gubernatorial election, Democrat Barbara Buono received 70.5% of the vote (7,613 cast), ahead of Republican Chris Christie with 28.3% (3,057 votes), and other candidates with 1.2% (131 votes), among the 10,941 ballots cast by the township's 29,768 registered voters (140 ballots were spoiled), for a turnout of 36.8%. In the 2009 gubernatorial election, Democrat Jon Corzine received 73.9% of the vote (10,139 ballots cast), ahead of Republican Chris Christie with 18.7% (2,573 votes), Independent Chris Daggett with 5.8% (801 votes) and other candidates with 0.8% (104 votes), among the 13,723 ballots cast by the township's 26,843 registered voters, yielding a 51.1% turnout.

Transportation

Montclair is considered a commuter suburb of New York City. NJ Transit and DeCamp Bus Lines are the providers of public transportation.  The average Montclair commute is 38 minutes each way. About 24% of commuters take mass transit, while 59% drive alone. Twelve times more Montclair commuters take mass transit than the national average.

Roads and highways

Major roads in the township include County Route 506 (Bloomfield Avenue).

There is a taxi stand near Bloomfield Avenue in eastern Montclair, in front of Lackawanna Plaza, formerly the Montclair train station.

Bus
NJ Transit buses 11, 28, 29, 34, 97, 191 and 705 run through Montclair, most going along the main street, Bloomfield Avenue. The NJ transit bus routes are:
 #11 from Downtown Newark through Verona, Cedar Grove, and Little Falls to Willowbrook Mall in Wayne.  The only Montclair street it goes along is Bloomfield Avenue.
 #28 follows the route of #29 on Bloomfield Avenue until halfway through Montclair, where it goes north along Park Street, Watchung Avenue, and Valley Road to Montclair State University, and to Willowbrook Mall on Weekends
 #29 between West Caldwell and Newark, passing through Caldwell, Verona, Montclair, Glen Ridge, and Bloomfield on Bloomfield Avenue.  It goes to Parsippany at rush hour.  The only Montclair street it goes along is Bloomfield Avenue.
 #34 to Newark through East Orange and Orange on some trips, otherwise it goes to Bloomfield along Orange Road, Elm Street, and Bloomfield Avenue.  It goes farther to the Montclair High School during that school's start and end times.
 #97 goes from the Montclair Center south along Orange and Harrison Roads through the Oranges.
 #191 goes from Willowbrook Mall through Little Falls to Montclair State University, then to the Port Authority Bus Terminal in Midtown Manhattan.
 #705 goes from Passaic along Alexander Avenue, Grove Street (for one block), Mt. Hebron Road and through Montclair State University to Willowbrook Mall.
All of these routes except #97, #191, and #705 were trolley lines originally, operated by the Public Service Railway.  A trolley garage existed on Bloomfield Avenue.  In the 1930s and 1950s the trolleys were destroyed and replaced with buses.

DeCamp Bus Lines routes 33 and 66 run through Montclair to the Port Authority Bus Terminal in New York City, carrying primarily commuters.
 #33 goes along Bloomfield Avenue, with some buses going onto Grove Street
 #66 goes along Orange Road, Park Street, Valley Road, and Mt. Hebron Road

Montclair State University has shuttle buses going around its campus.

The township of Montclair operates a jitney in the evening from the Bay Street train station to the southern end of Montclair.

Rail

Running through Montclair is the Montclair-Boonton Line, serving New York Penn Station via Hoboken Terminal to the east, and Hackettstown to the west. Seven NJ Transit Rail stations serve Montclair: Bay Street, Walnut Street, Watchung Avenue, Upper Montclair, Mountain Avenue, and Montclair Heights in Montclair, and Montclair State University station in the Great Notch area of Little Falls. Only Bay Street station has weekend train service.

Montclair has a long history of railroads. The first railroad to Montclair was built in 1856 by the Newark and Bloomfield Railroad. It terminated at a station in Downtown Montclair.  First the Morris and Essex Railroad, then the Delaware, Lackawanna and Western Railroad leased the line.

In 1868, the Montclair Railway built another line through Montclair, which caused disputes leading to Montclair's separation from Bloomfield. Shortly afterward it was taken over by the New York and Greenwood Lake Railway, a subsidiary of the Erie Railroad. A third railroad to Morristown was planned in 1860 and construction began, but the Panic of 1873 ended the project. In 1912 the Lackawanna Railroad built a large terminal at the end of their line.  The Erie and Lackawanna Railroads later merged, forming the Erie-Lackawanna Railroad, which operated both lines for many decades.  They were next operated by Conrail for approximately one year, after which NJ Transit took over passenger operations and Conrail continued freight operations.  Meanwhile, the 1912 terminal was closed in 1981 and converted into shops. This station was replaced by the Bay Street station. In 2002, the two railway lines were connected with the construction of the Montclair Connection.

Housing
Montclair is noted for its historic architecture. It is home to six historic districts listed on the Register of Historic Places of both the state and country as a whole, 92 individually listed landmarks, and two locally designated commercial districts. Works by significant architects include designs by Van Vleck and Goldsmith, Charles Follen McKim, McKim, Mead, and White, Henry Hudson Holly, Charles A. Platt, Alexander Jackson Davis, Dudley Van Antwerp, Effingham R. North, Montrose Morris, and Frances Nelson, among others.

In 2018, Bobbi Brown, founder and ex-CCO of Bobbi Brown Cosmetics, and her husband, realtor Steven Plofker opened The George, a 32-room boutique hotel on North Mountain Avenue that was originally a private home constructed in 1902.

Montclair has also housed many hotels, such as the defunct Hotel Montclair. In 2013, plans were announced to bring a new hotel to Montclair, featuring 100 rooms and a liquor license.

Education

The Montclair Public Schools serve students in kindergarten through twelfth grade. The district consists of seven elementary schools, three middle schools and one high school. As of the 2018–19 school year, the district, comprised of 11 schools, had an enrollment of 6,767 students and 564.8 classroom teachers (on an FTE basis), for a student–teacher ratio of 12.0:1. Schools in the district (with 2018–19 enrollment data from the National Center for Education Statistics) are
Bradford Elementary School (436 students; in grades K–5, Magnet Theme: The University Magnet), 
Charles H. Bullock Elementary School (448; K–5, Environmental Science), 
Edgemont Montessori School (280; K–5, Montessori), 
Hillside Elementary School (577; 3–5, Gifted and Talented), 
Nishuane Elementary School (417; K–2, Gifted and Talented), 
Northeast Elementary School (412; K–5, Global Studies), 
Watchung Elementary School (425; K–5, Science and Technology), 

Buzz Aldrin Middle School (667; 6–8, The STEM Magnet), 
Glenfield Middle School (675; 6–8, Visual and Performing Arts), 
Renaissance Middle School at the Rand Building (257; 6–8, Liberal Arts) and 
Montclair High School (2,081; 9–12).

Montclair is home to Montclair State University, which was founded in 1908 as the New Jersey State Normal School at Montclair.

The Roman Catholic Archdiocese of Newark supervises the operation of Immaculate Conception High School (coed) and Lacordaire Academy (for girls)at the high school level and Lacordaire Academy Lower Division and St. Cassian School for grades Pre-K–8. In 2016, St. Cassian School was one of ten schools in New Jersey, and one of four private schools in the state, recognized as a National Blue Ribbon School by the United States Department of Education, a recognition celebrating excellence in academics.

Montclair is also home to a host of private and parochial schools, including Montclair Kimberley Academy, Montclair Community Pre-K, Montclair Cooperative School, Virginia Harkness Sawtelle Learning, Maria Montessori Early Learning, Montclair Cooperative School, Trinity Academy and Deron School II.

Media

Montclair has three local newspapers, the Montclair Dispatch, the Montclair Times and as of 2017, The Montclair Local. In addition, there is a radio station at 90.3 FM on the campus of Montclair State University, WMSC. The township has a municipal public service television channel, Channel 34, where township council and school board meetings are broadcast. Montclair High School has its own paper the Mountaineer, and  Montclair State University has its own student-run paper, the Montclarion. WNJN - one of four stations of state-wide PBS member station NJTV - is also located there.

Sister cities
Montclair's sister cities are:
 Aquilonia, Italy
 Barnet, London, United Kingdom
 Cherepovets, Russia
 Graz, Austria

Points of interest

 Montclair Art Museum
 Howard Van Vleck Arboretum
 Presby Memorial Iris Gardens
 Van Vleck House and Gardens
 Crane House and Museum
 The Montclair Historical Society, which consists of:
 Nathaniel Crane House
 Clark House
 Evergreens (House)
 Yogi Berra Stadium and the Yogi Berra Museum and Learning Center
 Revolutionary War site markers for the temporary headquarters of Marquis de Lafayette and George Washington
 Note: There is no written record to verify that Washington had spent time in Montclair (then called "Cranetown") or Upper Montclair (then called "Speertown") during the time period, but the story was passed down by generations orally and the two markers were placed in the 1900s.
 Brookdale Park
 Parks and dining in Upper Montclair

Historic sites

Montclair is home to the following locations on the National Register of Historic Places:

 The Anchorage – 155 Wildwood Avenue (added 1988)
 Anderson Park – SE corner of Bellevue and North Mountain Avenue (added 2009)
 Joseph Bardsley House – 345 Park Street (added 1988)
 Bradner's Pharmacy – 33 Watchung Plaza  (added 1988)
 Carnegie Library – Church Street at Valley Road (added 1988)
 Casa Deldra – 35 Afterglow Way  (added 1988)
 Central Presbyterian Church – 46 Park Street (added 1986)
 J. M. Chapman House – 10 Rockledge  (added 1988)
 Cliffside Hose Company No. 4 – 588 Valley Road (added 1988)
 Congregational Church – 42 S. Fullerton Avenue (added 1988)
 Israel Crane House – 110 Orange Road(added 1973)
 Eastward – 50 Lloyd Road (added 1988)
 Egbert Farm – 128 N. Mountain Avenue (added 1988)
 Henry Fenn House – 208 N. Mountain Avenue (added 1988)
 First Methodist Episcopal Church – 24 N. Fullerton Avenue (added 1988)
 Free Public Library, Upper Montclair Branch – 185 Bellevue Avenue (added 1988)
 Frank Goodwillie House – 17 Wayside Place (added 1988)
 Haskell's Bloomfield Villa – 84 Llewellyn Road (added 1988)
 House at 147 Park Street – 147 Park Street (added 1988)
 The House that Lives – 83 Watchung Avenue (added 1988)
 Marlboro Park Historic District – Roughly along Fairfield Street, Waterbury Road, Montclair Avenue, and Watchung Avenue between N. Fullerton and Grove Streets (added 1988)
 Marsellis House – 190 Cooper Avenue (added 1988)
 Miller Street Historic District – 	Miller and Fulton Streets between Elmwood Avenue, Elm and New Streets (added 1988)
 George A. Miller House – 275 Claremont Avenue (added 1988)
 Montclair Art Museum – 3 S. Mountain Avenue (added 1986)
 Montclair Railroad Station – Lackawanna Plaza (added 1973)
 Mountain Avenue station – 451 Upper Mountain Avenue (added 1984)
 Mountain District – Roughly bounded by Highland, Bradford, Upper Mountain and Claremont Avenue (added 1988)
 Mulford House – 207 Union Street (added 1988)
 Pine Street Historic District – Roughly bounded by Glenridge Avenue, the NJ Transit Boonton Line, Pine and Baldwin Streets (added 2000)
 Post Office Building, Upper Montclair – 242–244 Bellevue Avenue (added 1988)
 Presby Memorial Iris Gardens Horticultural Center – 474 Upper Mountain Avenue (added 1980)
 M. F. Reading House – 87 Midland Avenue (added 1988)
 Red Gables – 99 S. Fullerton Avenue (added 1988)
 Charles S. Shultz House – 30 N. Mountain Avenue (added 1979)
 S. C. Smith House – 40 Northview Avenue (added 1988)
 St. Luke's Church – 69 S. Fullerton Avenue (added 1988)
 Stone Eagles – 60 Undercliff Road (added 1988)
 Upper Montclair station – 275 Bellevue Avenue (added 1984)
 Van Reyper-Bond House – 848 Valley Road (added 1979)
 Von Schmid House – 580 Park Street (added 1988)
 Watchung Avenue station – Park Street (added 1984)
 Allyn Wight House – 75 Gates Avenue (added 1988)

In popular culture

Location in, and home to the authors of, Cheaper by the Dozen
In the 1948 biographical novel Cheaper by the Dozen, the principal characters Frank Bunker Gilbreth Sr. and Lillian Moller Gilbreth live in Montclair, as the authors did in real life.

Motor Vehicle: The Mercury Montclair 
The Mercury Montclair was an automobile marque of Ford produced in the 1950s and 1960s. The Phaeton model was a significant prize in Ed Sullivan's $425,000 Mercury Contest, an eight-week promotion that awarded a total of 80 vehicles and hundreds of other prizes.

Notable people

References
Notes

External links

 Township of Montclair official website
 Montclair Business Improvement District
 Montclair Historical Society
 

 
1868 establishments in New Jersey
Cannabis in New Jersey
Faulkner Act (council–manager)
Populated places established in 1868
Townships in Essex County, New Jersey